Kareng is a village in North-West District of Botswana.

Kareng may also refer to:

 Kareng language, an Mbum language of the Central African Republic
 Noah Kareng (21st century), Botswana footballer

See also

 Karang